Catacombs of Chaos is a play-by-mail game that was published by Schubel & Son.

Gameplay
Catacombs of Chaos was a turn-based game where each player is in command of a team of characters entering the catacombs of a dead wizard. It was a dungeon-exploration game with a ratings system for players.

Reception
W. G. Armintrout reviewed Catacombs of Chaos in The Space Gamer No. 57. Armintrout commented that "Catacombs of Chaos is an ill-explained and confusing game. The worst problem lies with the lack of information given to the players about such basics as character design, magic, and combat."

In the April 1983 edition of Dragon (Issue 72), Michael Gray found the game to be very similar to Heroic Fantasy by Flying Buffalo.

A reviewer in a 1983 issue of PBM Universal stated that, other than no available special actions, "the game is fine".

See also
 List of play-by-mail games

References

Play-by-mail games